Riihimäki (literally "Drying barn hill") is a town and municipality in the south of Finland, about  north of Helsinki and  southeast of Tampere. An important railway junction is located in Riihimäki, since railway tracks from Riihimäki lead to Helsinki, Tampere and Lahti.
Several businesses also operate in Riihimäki. Notably, Würth Oy has its Finnish headquarters and logistics center in Riihimäki. Valio has a major dairy in the Herajoki part of Riihimäki. The famous Sako rifles are also produced in Riihimäki. Riihimäki also has the second-highest flagpole in Finland.

 
The town is located in the province of Southern Finland and is part of the Tavastia Proper region. The municipality is unilingually Finnish.

Riihimäki is home to the Riihimäki Prison, which is, alongside Turku Prison, one of the prisons in the country with the highest security rating (A+), and is home to the country's most dangerous prisoners.

History
Riihimäki was established around the Riihimäki railway station by the Helsinki–Riihimäki railway, and is one of the original stations on Finland's first railway between Helsinki and Hämeenlinna, which opened in 1862. It became the first railway junction in Finland when the Riihimäki – Saint Petersburg track's first section from Riihimäki to Lahti was opened in 1869. In 1907-1952 a narrow-gauge railway also operated between Riihimäki and Loppi. Today, the quickest way to travel between Riihimäki and Loppi is by car along the national road 54, which runs between Tammela and Hollola.

In 1910, a cavalry regiment was also established in the city.

In 1922, Riihimäki separated from Hausjärvi and became an independent market-town. Riihimäki got its city rights in 1960. It was home to the reputed Riihimäki Glass company that remained in business from 1910 through 1990.

The Finnish Glass Museum with its permanent display created by famous designer Tapio Wirkkala was opened in 1981.

Sports
 Peltosaaren Nikkarit & Kiekko-Nikkarit (Ice hockey)
Riihimäen Taitoluistelijat (Figure skating)
Riihimäen Jäätaiturit (Synchronized skating)
 Kolmoskori (Basketball)
 Riihimäen Ilves, formerly RIPS (Soccer)
 SC Top (Floorball)
 Cocks (Handball)
 Riihi-Pesis, formerly RPL (Finnish baseball)
 Riihimäen Kisko (Athletics)
 Riihimäen Uimaseura (Swimming)

Notable individuals

Athletes
 Aki Seitsonen, ice hockey player
 Arri Munnukka, football player
 Daniel O'Shaughnessy, football player
 Janne Lahti, SM-Liiga ice hockey player
 Jukka Jalonen, national ice hockey coach and ice hockey player
 Jukka Vanninen, football player
 Jussi Veikkanen, professional road racing cyclist
 Kari Tiainen, motorcycle enduro world champion
 Kasper Kenig, ice hockey player
 Lauri Toivonen, basketball player
 Max Kenig, ice hockey player
 Olli Korkeavuori, ice hockey player
 Patrick O'Shaughnessy, football player
 Pekka Vasala, middle and long-distance runner; Olympic champion (1972) in the 1,500 metres
 Sami Lähteenmäki, SM-Liiga ice hockey player
 Tero Arkiomaa, ice hockey player
 Tuomas Viertola, basketball player

Politicians
 Aino-Kaisa Pekonen, Member of Parliament
 Arto Lapiolahti, Member of Parliament
 Efraim Kronqvist, politician and Riihimäki Red Guard leader in 1918
 Helge Sirén, Member of Parliament
 Iiro Viinanen, politician
 Päivi Räsänen, politician

The arts
 Liisa Akimof, musician
 Pekka Autiovuori, actor
 Torsten Brander, music contributor
 Tommi Hakala, singer
 Renny Harlin, film director and film producer
 Aku Hirviniemi, actor
 Anita Hirvonen, pop singer
 Maija Isola, designer
 Erkki Junkkarinen, singer
 Janne Kataja, actor
 Jukka Koskinen, musician
 Niina Lahtinen, actor
 Sinikka Laine, writer
 Emilia Linnavuori, visual artist
Nest, music group
 Lauren Okadigbo, actress
 Samuli Paronen, writer
 Veikko Sinisalo, actor
Skepticism, music group
 Seppo Tamminen, artist
 Jann Wilde, musician and songwriter

Other
 Arvi Paloheimo, industrialist
 Olli Paloheimo, forester, minister and Jäger
 Ragnar Granit, physician who won the 1967 Nobel Prize in Physiology and Medicine
 Veikko Löyttyniemi, journalist

Twin towns – sister cities

Riihimäki is twinned with:
  Szolnok, Hungary
  Skedsmo, Norway
  Húsavík, Iceland
  Gus-Khrustalny, Russia
  Karlskoga, Sweden
  Aalborg, Denmark
  Bad Segeberg, Germany

References
Notes

External links

 Town of Riihimäki – Official website
 Hyrinet – Hyvinkää–Riihimäki area portal
 Finnish Glass Museum - Riihimäki

 
Cities and towns in Finland
Municipalities of Kanta-Häme
Populated places established in 1922
1922 establishments in Finland